Hebei Hengshui High School is a well-known municipal public Gaokao-preparatory high school in Hengshui, Hebei, China. It was established in 1951.

Hengshui High School is a strict-discipline school that its students must obey a strict set of rules and regulations. Students are all required to study more than 15 hours per day and almost 7 days per week. Nicola Davison of The Daily Telegraph wrote that therefore "In Chinese media Hengshui High is often compared to a prison camp". Alice Yan of the South China Morning Post stated that "The military-style schooling has been proven to work."

Hengshui High opened branch schools in various provinces. Parents in Zhejiang criticized the school's methods, believing they are overly harsh.

Famous alumni 
 Gao, Jie: Associate Professor at Department of Computer Science, Stony Brook University. NSF CAREER award winner.
 Zhou Xiyuan: China Electronics Technology Group Corporation, China Electronics Technology Group Corporation 54th Institute Director

School life 
The school regulations and activities of Hengshui High School are quite unique and become an important part of the image of it.

Working hours 
Hengshui High School strictly stipulates the working hours of students. Get up at 5:30 every day, wash the housekeeping, start running at 5:40 on the playground, start morning reading after the running, start breakfast in batches at 6:30, have early preparations for self-study after breakfast, and then start class. 40 minutes per class. There are five classes in the morning and a run in the third class (inter-class exercises). 12:45 to 13:45 for lunch break. There are five classes in the afternoon. After the dinner in each grade, watch the news from 18:50 to 19:10 ("News 30 Minutes"). There are three lessons in the evening for self-study, ending at 21:50, 22 : 10 lights out and goes to bed. The start time of each class and the two minutes before the bedtime are preparation time. The "entry status" is required. For example, two minutes before the class starts, no jokes, no water, and two minutes before bedtime, you must lie in bed and go to bed.

School assignment and exams
Hengshui High School implements "Regard self-study as exams, regard exams as National Higher Education Entrance Examination". Hengshui High School has a comprehensive test every week, and there is a large-scale research exam with the standard of the college entrance examination every month. Both small tests and large-scale tests have students rank and class rank. School assignment and examination papers are written by the teacher.

Holidays 
During the semester, the students take a vacation every three weeks, and the time ranges from about one day in the first year to one night in the third year.

Featured Events 
The special activities of Hengshui High School include the "80 Chinese mile hiking" held in the first grade, the "coming-of-age ceremony" held in the second year, and the "100 day oath of the National Higher Education Entrance Examination" held in the third year, etc.

See also
 Hengshui No. 2 High School

References

Further reading

External links
Hengshui High School 
Hengshui High School 
Top 50 high school in China

Educational institutions established in 1951
High schools in Hebei
1951 establishments in China
Hengshui